Lee Jae-won (born June 2, 1992) is a South Korean football player.

Playing career
Lee Jae-won played for J3 League club; Kataller Toyama in 2015 season.

References

External links

1992 births
Living people
South Korean footballers
J3 League players
Kataller Toyama players
Association football forwards